Monique Smit (born 26 February 1991) is a South African professional golfer playing on the Ladies European Tour (LET). She was runner-up at the 2020 South African Women's Open and won the 2020 Sunshine Ladies Tour Order of Merit.

Amateur career
Smit had a championship-winning amateur career including four titles on the 2005 Ernie Els Junior Tour and was a two-time Gus Ackermann Champion, in 2010 and 2011. She won the Western Province Stroke Play Championship in 2008 and 2011. She joined the National Team and represented South Africa internationally from the age of 15 including at the 2008 Espirito Santo Trophy and the 2008 All Africa Challenge Trophy, where she was the individual winner. She won titles on three different continents, having triumphed at the Jakarta World Junior Championship and Gosh Leinster Championship in Ireland.

Professional career
Smit turned professional in 2012 and joined the LET. She secured her first professional win on the 2014 Sunshine Ladies Tour, at the Dimension Data Ladies Pro-Am, setting a new course record of 63 at Oubaai Golf Club. In 2014, she also won the SuperSport Ladies Challenge and was runner-up at the Zambia Ladies Open. In 2016, she won the Tshwane Ladies Open before an injury caused a four-year lay-off from tour.

Staging a comeback, Smit earned her full Ladies European Tour card for 2020 at qualifying school, winning a four-way playoff for the 20th and last card. On the 2020 Ladies European Tour, she was runner-up at the Investec South African Women's Open, one stroke behind Alice Hewson who won in her first start as a rookie member of the tour.

Smit won the 2020 Joburg Ladies Open and 2020 Sunshine Ladies Tour Order of Merit.

Amateur wins
2005 Ernie Els Junior Tour
2007 KZN Junior Championship 
2008 Western Province Stroke Play Championship, Jakarta World Junior Championship, All Africa Challenge Trophy (Individual)
2010 Gus Ackermann Championship, Gosh Leinster Championship 
2011 Gus Ackermann Championship, Guateng Matchplay Championship, Western Province Stroke Play Championship

Source:

Professional wins (4)

Sunshine Ladies Tour wins (4)
2014 (2) Dimension Data Ladies Pro-Am, Supersport Ladies Challenge
2016 (1) Ladies Tshwane Open
2020 (1) Joburg Ladies Open

Results in LPGA majors

CUT = missed the half-way cut
NT = no tournament

Team appearances
Amateur
Espirito Santo Trophy (representing South Africa): 2008
All Africa Challenge Trophy (representing South Africa): 2008 (winners)

References

External links

South African female golfers
Ladies European Tour golfers
Sportspeople from the Western Cape
People from George, South Africa
People from Mbombela
1991 births
Living people